Hamza Al-Farissi (Berber: ⵃⴰⵎⵣⴰ ⵍⴼⴰⵔⵉⵙⵉ, Ḥamza l-Farisi; Arabic: حمزة الفارسي, Hamzat āl-Fārisi; born 1 August 1994), better known by the mononym Hamza, is a Belgian rapper, singer and beatmaker. Hamza is signed to Rec. 118 and Warner Music.

Career
Born in Laeken, a commune of Brussels, to parents of Moroccan origin, he formed the hip hop band Kilogramme Gang as an adolescent with his friends Triton and MK. He also used the logo "Saucegod". The band released the urban project Gotham City Vol. 1. Hamza composed the beats used by the band.

After the band broke up, Hamza went solo in 2013 releasing his solo debut Recto Verso. After meeting Dakose, he resumed his musical activity with the latter as his manager. In May 2015, he released the mixtape H-24 exclusively on the site HauteCulture.com, gaining public attention in Belgium and France. This was followed by the project Zombie Life with wider appeal, and in 2016, the EP New Casanova with dancehall beats. In December 2016, he added the mixtape Santa Sauce, made available for free on SoundCloud.

The mixtape 1994 has been his major chart success, making it to number 13 on the French Belgian albums chart and to number 9 in France. A number of singles also charted including "Life", "Vibes" and "Paradise".

His debut studio album Paradise was released in March 2019. The album includes featurings with Aya Nakamura, Christine & the Queens, Oxmo Puccinno, 13 Block, SCH, and A.CHAL. In December, he released the mixtape Santa Sauce 2 which featured Damso, Koba LaD and Gambi.

140 BPM 2 was released on 5 February 2021. The project includes featurings with Headie One, Gazo, Guy2Bezbar and Kaaris.

On 17 February 2023, he released the album Sincèrement. The project featured Tiakola, Damso, Offset and Ckay.

Discography

Albums

Mixtapes

EPs

Singles

As lead artist

*Did not appear in the official Belgian Ultratop 50 charts, but rather in the bubbling under Ultratip charts.

As featured artist

Other charted songs

References

Belgian rappers
Belgian male singers
Belgian Muslims
1994 births
Living people
People from Laeken
Belgian people of Moroccan descent